"Solitary Rose" is a song by German recording artist Jeanette. It was written by her along with AJ Junior and Carl Falk, and produced by the latter for her seventh studio album Undress to the Beat (2009). Released as the album's third and final single in German-speaking Europe in October 2009, the ballad reached the top twenty of the Austrian and German Singles Charts, becoming the album's highest-charting single in Austria and Switzerland. Highly promoted on Sat.1 telenovela Anna und die Liebe, in which Jeanette starred from 2008 until 2012, it marks her last single as solo artist until 2019.

Formats and track listings

Charts

References

2009 songs
Jeanette Biedermann songs
Songs written by Jeanette Biedermann
Songs written by Carl Falk
Songs written by AJ Junior
2000s ballads